Jamia Al-Barkaat Aligarh educational institute is an institute of Sunni Muslims of India. It was established in the memory of renowned Persian and Hindi Sufi poet, Syed Shah Barkatullah of Marehra Sharif in the District of Etah in Uttar Pradesh.
Ameen Mian Qaudri is president of the society which runs Jamia Al Barkaat.

Society
It is run by Al-Barkaat Educational Society (ABES) aims to establish and administer educational institutions under the rights and duties as provided under Article 30 of the Indian Constitution.
The Society derives inspiration from the life and teachings of a galaxy of illustrious Sufis of Khanqah-e-Barkaatiya, Mahrehra Sharif, District Etah, Uttar Pradesh. The family headed by Sajjada Nasheen of Khanqah-e-Barkaatiya, Prof. S.M. Amin includes names which have long association with academics and education and have keen interest in developing quality educational institutions.

Departments
Management
Education
Computer Education
Business Administration

Facilities
Library
Computer Lab
Gymnasium
Guest House
Hostel
Mosque
Loan Facility

Placement services
The organizations we contacted include: Erika Forbes ICICI India Mart India Infoline India Bulls HCL Technologies Bharati Tele Venture Ltd. HDFC TCS (Tata Consultancy Services) Goodyear Hero Honda Air Sahara Indian Airlines Oberoi Sheraton.

Scholarships
Merit Scholarship and Fee Wainers : Meritorious students are awarded merit Scholarship and fee wainer as a policy for encouragement. Fee wainer has been granted to students to the extent of 50%, 75%, and 100%. At present 5% students are enjoying this benefit.

See also
Al-Barkaat Public School
Ahle Sunnat Barelvi
Ameen Mian Qaudri

References

External links
Official website

Islamic universities and colleges in India
Universities and colleges in Aligarh
Educational institutions established in 2001
2001 establishments in Uttar Pradesh